CEA/Cesta or simply Cesta is a French research facility (CEA, Direction of Military Applications) dedicated to the design of nuclear weapons.

The center was established in 1965 on the commune of Le Barp between Bordeaux and Arcachon.

The center hosts the Megajoule laser (LMJ), which should enable French nuclear scientists to validate models of nuclear explosion without having to conduct nuclear testing. The LMJ is the French equivalent of the National Ignition Facility.

External links
 Page of the center on the CEA's Direction of Military Applications website
 Official site of the Mega-joule laser

Government agencies of France
Nuclear weapons program of France
Military research installations
1965 establishments in France

Research and development organizations
Military research of France